Vítor Manuel Melo Pereira (born 21 April 1957) is a retired football (soccer) referee from Portugal, best known for supervising four matches at the FIFA World Cup: two in 1998 and 2002.

Since August 2017 he was the head of Greek refereeing appointed directly by FIFA.

On 23 September 2021, he was hired by the Russian Football Union to head their refereeing department, replacing Viktor Kassai. On 15 March 2022, he resigned from the RFU position.

References

External links
 Profile

1957 births
Portuguese football referees
FIFA World Cup referees
Sportspeople from Lisbon
Living people
UEFA Champions League referees
1998 FIFA World Cup referees
2002 FIFA World Cup referees
UEFA Euro 2000 referees